John Speed Smith (July 1, 1792 – June 6, 1854) was an attorney and politician, a  U.S. Representative from Kentucky, and a state representative for several terms, as well as state senator. He served for four years as a US District Attorney. He was the father of Green Clay Smith, who also served as a state representative and US Congressman.

Early life, education and military service
John Speed Smith was born on July 1, 1792, to Mary (née Speed) and William Smith near Nicholasville, Kentucky in Jessamine County. Smith attended a private school in Mercer County. After that, he "read the law" with an established firm. He was admitted to the bar in 1812 and commenced practice in Richmond, Kentucky.

During the War of 1812, Smith enlisted as a private. He was subsequently promoted and commissioned as a major. He served as aide-de-camp, with the rank of colonel, to General William Henry Harrison, later president of the United States.

Marriage and family
In 1815 at the age of 23, Smith married Elizabeth Lewis Clay (1798-1887), then 17, the daughter of Green Clay, considered one of the wealthiest men in Kentucky, and Sally (Lewis) Clay. Their several children included Sally Ann Lewis Smith (1818-1875), named for her maternal grandmother; Curran Cassius Smith, Green Clay Smith, named for his maternal grandfather; Pauline Green Smith, Junius Brutus Smith (never married), Mary Spencer Smith(never married), and John Speed Smith, Jr.

Curran Cassius Smith became a doctor. He also managed his father's estate after his mother was widowed, making his home with her and his family. Green Clay Smith followed his father and maternal uncles into law and politics, serving at both the state and federal levels.

Political career
John Speed Smith was elected to the state house of representatives in 1819, serving one term.

Smith was elected as a Republican to the Seventeenth Congress to fill the vacancy caused by the resignation of George Robertson and served from August 6, 1821, to March 3, 1823.
He was not a candidate for renomination in 1822.

He was elected again as a member of the state house of representatives in 1827, when he was also elected as speaker of the Kentucky House.

Smith was appointed by President John Quincy Adams to go on a mission to South America. He was appointed as United States district attorney for Kentucky by President Andrew Jackson, serving 1828-1832.

He was elected again to the state house in 1839, 1841, and 1845. He was elected as a member of the state senate, serving 1846-1850.

Smith died in Richmond, Kentucky, June 6, 1854, and was interred in Richmond Cemetery.

References

External links

1792 births
1854 deaths
Kentucky state senators
Members of the Kentucky House of Representatives
People from Kentucky in the War of 1812
People from Jessamine County, Kentucky
United States Army officers
Democratic-Republican Party members of the United States House of Representatives from Kentucky
Green Clay family
19th-century American politicians
United States Attorneys for the District of Kentucky